The Alpini Battalion "Val Tagliamento" is an inactive battalion of the Italian Army's mountain infantry speciality, the Alpini, which distinguished itself in combat during World War I and World War II.

History

World War I 

The battalion was raised on 10 February 1915 with reservists of the Alpini Battalion "Tolmezzo" of the 8th Alpini Regiment. The battalion's name, like the names of all Alpini battalions raised during World War I with first line reservists, was the name of a valley near the active battalion's depot; in the Val Tagliamento battalion's case the Tagliamento valley, which extends north from Tolmezzo. As with all Alpini battalions the recruits for the battalions were drafted exclusively from the area surrounding the battalions depot. Initially the battalion fielded the 212th and 272nd Alpini companies, and received the 278th Alpini Company on 1 November 1916.

The Val Tagliamento battalion's history is intertwined with the history of the 8th Alpini Regiment, with which it served during World War I. After having suffered heavy losses during the Battle of Caporetto and the following retreat to the Piave the battalion was disbanded on 15 February 1918. For its conduct during the war the battalion was awarded a Silver Medal of Military Valour.

World War II 
The battalion was reformed in August 1939 and assigned on 19 November 1940 to the 3rd Alpine Division "Julia" for service in the Greco-Italian War. The battalion suffered heavily during the fighting in the Pindus mountains and lost its commanding officer on 8 January 1941 to enemy fire. After the German invasion of Greece and the Greek surrender the battalion was sent to Yugoslavia on anti-partisan duties. For its conduct during the Greco-Italian war the battalion was awarded a Silver Medal of Military Valour. In July 1943 the battalion returned to its depot in Tolmezzo, where the battalion was renamed Alpini Battalion "Tolmezzo", as the original Tolmezzo battalion had been destroyed in Ukraine during the Italian Army in Russia's retreat in January 1943.

Cold War 

On 1 July 1963 the XV Alpini Fortification Battalion in Stazione Carnia was renamed Alpini Battalion "Val Tagliamento". The battalion was part of the 11th Alpini Fortification Grouping of the Alpine Brigade "Julia" and tasked with manning fortifications in the upper Canale valley, which the Italian Army (correctly) assumed to be one of two main directions of a possible Warsaw Pact advance. Initially the Val Tagliamento fielded six companies, but on 30 June 1964 a further three companies arrived from the disbanded Alpini Battalion "Val Natisone". During the 1975 army reform the 11th Alpini Fortification Grouping was disbanded on 1 June 1975, as was the Val Tagliamento's sister battalion the Alpini Battalion "Val Fella", whose six companies were transferred to the Val Tagliamento. After the reform the Val Tagliamento received the war flag and traditions of the 11th Alpini Fortification Grouping, moved its headquarters to Tolmezzo. The battalion fielded now 16 Alpini companies with an organic strength of over 2,500 men, making it by far the largest battalion in the Italian Army. Below all companies of the battalion are listed with the Nappina color, which denotes to which battalion a company was originally assigned: = Val Tagliamento  = Val Fella  = Val Natisone

  Alpini Battalion "Val Tagliamento", in Tolmezzo
  Command and Services Company, in Tolmezzo
  212th Alpini Company (Type A*, Plöcken Pass fortifications)
  216th Alpini Company (Type B*, Campiolo fortifications)
  220th Alpini Company (Type C*, Portis fortifications)
  269th Alpini Company (Type B, Ugovizza fortifications)
  270th Alpini Company (Type C, Malborghetto fortifications)
  271st Alpini Company (Type C, Val d'Uque fortifications)
  272nd Alpini Company (Type C, Torre Moscarda fortifications)
  273rd Alpini Company (Type C, Tratte fortifications)
  278th Alpini Company (Type C, Stua di Ramaz fortifications)
  288th Alpini Company (Type C, Cavazzo fortifications)
  306th Alpini Company (Type C, Sella Sompdogna fortifications)
  307th Alpini Company (Type C, Sella Nevea fortifications)
  308th Alpini Company (Type B, Sella Carnizza fortifications)
  312th Alpini Company (Type C, Case Marco fortifications)
  313th Alpini Company (Type C, Cereschiatis fortifications)
  314th Alpini Company (Type C, Ponte del Cristo fortifications)

 Type A = fortification fully equipped, provisioned and manned; close support platoon on site
 Type B = fortification fully equipped, provisioned and manned; close support platoon off site
 Type C = fortification fully equipped; provisions, crew and close support platoon off site

For its conduct and work after the 1976 Friuli earthquake the battalion was awarded a Bronze Medal of Army Valour, which was affixed to the battalion's war flag and added to the battalion's coat of arms.

The fortifications the Val Tagliamento would man in case of war with the Warsaw Pact had been built as Alpine Wall in the early stages of World War II and as fixed fortifications became obsolete the battalion was steadily reduced in the second half of the 1980s consisted of the following companies:

  Alpini Battalion "Val Tagliamento", in Tolmezzo
  Command and Services Company, in Tolmezzo
  212th Alpini Company, in Paluzza
  216th Fortifications Maintenance and Surveillance Company, in Tolmezzo
  269th Alpini Company Ugovizza
  308th Fortifications Maintenance and Surveillance Company, in Pontebba

On 26 September 1992 the battalion was disbanded its war flag was transferred to the shrine of the flags at the Vittoriano in Rome.

Flag and coat of arms 
Three of the medals affixed to the Val Tagliamento's flag had actually been awarded to the Val Natisone battalion: one Silver Medal of Military Valour for the battalion's conduct during the Greco-Italian war and one Bronze Medal of Military Valour for the battalion's conduct during the Battle of Asiago;, respectively to the Val Fella battalion: one Silver Medal of Military Valour for the battalion's conduct during the Greco-Italian war. However when the two battalions were merged into the Val Tagliamento their decorations and traditions were added to the Val Tagliamento's.

External links
 Battaglione Alpini "Val Tagliamento" on vecio.it

Source 
 Franco dell'Uomo, R. di Rosa: "L'Esercito Italiano verso il 2000 - Volume Secondo - Tomo I", Rome 2001, Stato Maggiore dell'Esercito - Ufficio Storico, page: 500

References 

Alpini Battalions of Italy